The Barton Mystery (French: Le mystère Barton) is a 1949 French mystery film directed by Charles Spaak and starring Françoise Rosay, Fernand Ledoux and Madeleine Robinson. It is based on the 1916 British play The Barton Mystery by Walter C. Hackett. It was the screenwriter Spaak's only attempt at directing a film.

Cast
 Françoise Rosay as Élisabeth  
 Fernand Ledoux as Beverley  
 Madeleine Robinson as Lucy  
 Georges Lannes as Patrick  
 Nathalie Nattier as Evelyn  
 Loleh Bellon as Cathy  
 Jacques Torrens as Franck  
 Maurice Teynac as Barton  
 Jean Marchat as Olivier 
 Régine Dancourt 
 Jacques Mattler as Le juge  
 Robert Moor as Le domestique  
 Geneviève Morel as La bonne de Beverley  
 Victor Vina as Le mari trompé

References

Bibliography 
 David Quinlan. The Illustrated Guide to Film Directors. Batsford, 1983.

External links 
 

1949 mystery films
French mystery films
1949 films
1940s French-language films
Films set in England
French films based on plays
Remakes of British films
French black-and-white films
1940s French films